Emisija Koja Ide na Televiziju Poneđeljkom oko 9 uveče (trans. Show That Goes on Television on Mondays Around 9 p.m.) also known as Booksovci was a sketch comedy that was broadcast on RTCG during 2004.
The show is a work of The Books of Knjige a comedy group and alternative rock band from Cetinje. It had 10 episodes, each lasting up to 30 minutes.
Surreal humor was used in this show. They were showing the montenegrin way of living in a comic way, sometimes pushing it too hard.
The show was a big success in Montenegro and had a large audience.
This show was influenced in part by Monty Python's Flying Circus and Bosnian Top Lista Nadrealista.

Plot
Every episode would start with an elderly gentleman who would start talking non-sense, combining things that could not be combined.
He would start talking about something but he would always be talking about a completely different subject in the end.

After that, 2 or 3 sketches would follow.

Sketches
Like Monty Python, their sketches were a surreal and comic, sometimes sarcastic view of living in their country.
In their sketches, they made fun of policemen, habits of Montenegrin people, government, daily routine. 
Although some of their sketches look childish and could appear to be an imitation of Monty Python's, all of them have a deep meaning.

2004 Montenegrin television series debuts
Television sketch shows
Montenegrin television series
2005 Montenegrin television series endings
Radio and Television of Montenegro original programming